Astoria: Portrait of the Artist is a 1990 studio album by Tony Bennett. The title refers to Bennett's birthplace, Astoria, Queens.

Track listing
"When Do the Bells Ring for Me?" (Charles DeForest) – 2:58
"I Was Lost, I Was Drifting" (Kim Gannon, Bronisław Kaper) – 3:54
"A Little Street Where Old Friends Meet" (Gus Kahn, Harry M. Woods) – 3:17
"The Girl I Love" ("The Man I Love") (George Gershwin, Ira Gershwin) – 4:17
"It's Like Reaching for the Moon" (Al Sherman, Al Lewis, Gerald Marqusee) – 2:28
"Speak Low" (Ogden Nash, Kurt Weill) – 3:43
"The Folks Who Live On the Hill" (Oscar Hammerstein II, Jerome Kern) – 3:58
"Antonia" (Jack Segal, Robert Wells) – 3:05
"A Weaver of Dreams"/"There Will Never Be Another You" (Jack Elliott, Victor Young)/(Mack Gordon, Harry Warren) – 2:42
"Body and Soul" (Frank Eyton, Johnny Green, Edward Heyman, Robert Sour) – 4:00
"Where Do You Go from Love?" (DeForest) – 3:03
"The Boulevard of Broken Dreams" (Al Dubin, Harry Warren) – 2:21
"Where Did the Magic Go?" (P.J. Erickson, Buddy Weed) – 4:50
"I've Come Home Again" (DeForest) – 2:32

Personnel
 Tony Bennett – vocals
 Ralph Sharon – piano

References

1990 albums
Tony Bennett albums
Columbia Records albums